Russi Taylor (May 4, 1944 – July 26, 2019) was an American voice actress. She is best remembered as the voice of Minnie Mouse from 1986 to 2019, and was notably married to voice actor Wayne Allwine, the voice of Mickey Mouse, until his death on May 18, 2009. She is the longest-tenured voice actress to voice the character, having held the role for 33 years. She also provided the voices of several characters in The Simpsons.

Early life
Russi Taylor was born in Cambridge, Massachusetts, on May 4, 1944.

Career
Taylor began her voice-over career in the mid-1970s. Her first voice-over role was the voice of Ted and Georgette's baby on The Mary Tyler Moore Show. Taylor became the original voice of Minnie Mouse in 1986, and continued to voice the character for 33 years until her death in 2019. She also voiced Huey, Dewey, and Louie and Webby Vanderquack in the television series DuckTales and in other appearances. Taylor provided the voices of numerous characters in the animated series The Simpsons, including fourth-grade nerd Martin Prince, purple-haired twins Sherri and Terri, and German exchange student Üter. After her death, The Simpsons producers hired Grey DeLisle to succeed her.

She voiced Pebbles Flintstone in The Flintstone Comedy Show for Hanna-Barbera in 1980. Taylor was also the original voice of Strawberry Shortcake and the voice of Baby Gonzo in Muppet Babies, Nova in Twinkle, the Dream Being, Pac-Baby in the television series Pac-Man, the high-pitched Nurses that were mice in The Rescuers Down Under, Melissa in the Pound Puppies episode Garbage Night: The Musical, Queen Rosedust in My Little Pony, and her last non-Disney role was Birdie the Early Bird in McDonaldland commercials. She was also the voice of Drizella and the Fairy Godmother in the Cinderella sequels, Cinderella II: Dreams Come True and Cinderella III: A Twist in Time.

Personal life
She was married to Wayne Allwine, the third voice of Mickey Mouse, from 1991 up until his death in 2009. They were both named Disney Legends in 2008.

Death
Taylor died from colon cancer on July 26, 2019, at her home in Glendale, California, at the age of 75. She is interred at Forest Lawn Memorial Park right next to Allwine’s grave.

Filmography

Film

Television

Video games

Theme park attractions

Awards and nominations

References

External links

 
 
 

1944 births
2019 deaths
Actresses from Cambridge, Massachusetts
American radio actresses
American video game actresses
Audiobook narrators
Burials at Forest Lawn Memorial Park (Glendale)
Deaths from cancer in California
Deaths from colorectal cancer
Disney people
20th-century American actresses
21st-century American actresses